The Portland Mills Covered Bridge is the second oldest covered bridge in Parke County, Indiana, being built the same year as the Crooks Covered Bridge. It is a single span Burr Arch Truss covered bridge that was built by Henry Wolf in 1856.

It was added to the National Register of Historic Places in 1978.

History
The village of Portland Mills was settled in 1821 by Samuel Steele on the Parke County-Putnam County county line. Working to clear the land for farming he later built a mill in 1825 on Big Raccoon Creek. The grain mill had a water turbine, as opposed to a water wheel, and a sawmill. The mill would go through several owners, William Butcher, Jesse Thompson, and Wesley Holman. Holman would build a new three story mill on a solid sandstone foundation and obtained modern machinery. This mill would go through several owners also.  The list includes, Hirem Hocker, John Blake, Jacob Culver, James Williams, and a Mr. Williams.

While the Parke County Covered Bridge website claims the bridge started out in Union Township after looking at plat maps from 1874 it would appear that the bridge may have been in the southeast corner of Greene Township.

Because of the afore mentioned flooding of Big Raccoon Creek to build what was then called Mansfield lake, today's Cecil M. Harden Lake, in January 1961 the bridge was moved to its current location to replace the Dooley Station Covered Bridge which was the victim of arson in 1960.

The bridge was allowed to deteriorate  and fall into disrepair. Because sections of the roof and siding were later missing damaging rain was allowed in and the northeast corner had even been damaged by fire. The bridge was eventually closed in 1982 and bypassed by a ford. By the 1990s the bridge had fallen into severe neglect that it was in grave danger of collapse. However, funds from a grant and help from local organizations and donations allowed it to be restored to its original state in 1996. The bridge has even been reopened to traffic.

Gallery

See also
 List of Registered Historic Places in Indiana
 Parke County Covered Bridges
 Parke County Covered Bridge Festival

References

Covered bridges on the National Register of Historic Places in Parke County, Indiana
Bridges completed in 1856
Relocated buildings and structures in Indiana
Wooden bridges in Indiana
Burr Truss bridges in the United States